De Joya Griffith was an American CPA firm with headquarters in Henderson, Nevada focusing in audit services for small publicly held companies and private clients. The firm's branch offices were located in Pune, India, New York City, New York. and Beijing, China.

The company provided accounting services like bookkeeping and write-up services, financial forecast, cash flow & budgeting analysis and financial statements. Others include tax planning and preparations, auditing services and IRS presentation. It focused on consulting services on accounting automation system, estate and business planning, and fraud detection and prevention.

Inc. magazine has included De Joya Griffith on its sixth annual Inc. 500|5000, a ranking of America's fastest-growing private companies.

History

De Joya Griffith was established in 2005 by Jason Griffith who serves on the board of Entrepreneurs Organization in Las Vegas and Arthur De Joya a member of the board of the Las Vegas-Asian chamber of commerce. The firm launched an iPhone and iPad app "Audit 411" that helps help CFO's and CEO's prepare for their financial statements to be audited or reviewed.  The Firm closed down in September 2015.

Licenses and Registration

The firm was licensed with the state of Nevada and was registered with the Public Company Accounting Oversight Board, a US government organization and were registered with Canadian Public Accountability Board.

The company has registered trade mark of Audit 411.

The company was ranked # 12 on the Accounting News Report's 2012 SEC Registrant Auditor Analysis.

About Founders

Jason Griffith

Jason Griffith serves as the President of the Las Vegas Chapter of Entrepreneurs Organization. There was a lot of controversy and confusion when a man named Jason Griffith was charged for murder of his girlfriend, a Las Vegas burlesque dancer,  and arrested in Las Vegas in year 2010. However, he was another Jason Griffith, with full name as Jason Omer Griffith.

Jason Griffith, founder of De Joya Griffith, was also the founder of the Southern Nevada Auditing Association.

Griffith was also known in his college days as a story was published about him in USA Today in 1999 on his donation of Columbine Memorial Web Domain.

Arthur De Joya

Arthur De Joya was Chief Financial Officer of 3Pea International, a publicly traded company. He also serves as member Board of Directors in Las Vegas Asian Chamber of Commerce.

External links
Official Website of the Firm

References

Companies based in Henderson, Nevada
Accounting firms of the United States
Privately held companies based in the Las Vegas Valley
American companies established in 2005
2005 establishments in Nevada